William F. Bleakley (November 11, 1883 — October 2, 1969) was an American attorney, politician, and judge from Yonkers, New York. He is best known for being the first Westchester County Executive, and for being the unsuccessful Republican nominee for governor in 1936. Born in Verplanck, New York, Bleakley graduated from Cornell Law School and became an attorney in Yonkers. He served terms as a judge of the Yonkers city court and Westchester County court. From 1928 to 1936, he was a justice of the New York Supreme Court. 

Bleakley was the unsuccessful Republican nominee for Governor of New York in 1936. When Westchester County adopted an executive/legislature form of government in 1938, Bleakley was the successful Republican nominee to serve as the first county executive, and he held the post from 1939 to 1941. Bleakley died in Yonkers on October 2, 1969 and was buried at Gate of Heaven Cemetery in Hawthorne, New York.

Early life
Bleakley was born in Verplanck, New York on November 11, 1883.  He graduated from Peekskill's Drum Hill High School in 1899, and in 1904 he received his LL.B. degree from Cornell Law School.  Bleakley was admitted to the bar in 1905, and practiced in Yonkers.  From 1914 to 1917 he served on the school board in Yonkers.

Career

Judicial
He was judge of the Yonkers city court from 1918 to 1921.  In 1921 he was appointed to fill a vacancy on the Westchester County Court, where he served until winning election to the New York Supreme Court in 1928.  He served on the state supreme court until 1936, when he resigned after having won the Republican nomination for governor.

1936 gubernatorial election
In the 1936 general election, Bleakley was defeated by incumbent Herbert H. Lehman, 2,708,403 votes to 2,450,104.  Afterwards, Bleakley resumed practicing law in Yonkers, and was a delegate to the state constitutional convention of 1937-38.  He remained active in Republican politics, and was a delegate to the party's national conventions of 1940, 1944, and 1948, and an alternate delegate in 1952.

County executive
In 1938 Westchester County implemented a county executive/county legislature form of government.  Bleakley was the successful Republican nominee for county executive, and served from 1939 to 1941.

Later career
Bleakley served as chairman of the state Commission for Investigation of Workmen's Compensation Law Administration from 1942 to 1944, appointed by Governor Thomas E. Dewey.  In its final report the commission recommended several legislative and regulatory reforms designed to ensure that workers' compensation was administered efficiently and effectively.  In addition, he served in the 1940s as counsel for the state's Joint Legislative Committee on Reapportionment.

Personal life

Association with horse racing
Bleakley was involved in horse racing as: attorney for the Empire State Racing Association; attorney for the New York Racing Association; chairman of the board of Algam, the company which owned and operated Yonkers Raceway; and counsel and board of directors member for the Yonkers Trotting Association.

Civic and charitable activism
Bleakley was involved in civic and charitable causes, including: in 1946 Bleakley was chairman of the Yonkers Tercentennial Commission, which organized the 300th anniversary of the city's founding; member of the board of trustees of the Catholic Charities of the New York Archdiocese; president of the Cornell Law School Alumni Association; chairman of the Westchester Committee for the United Defense Fund (a post-World War II effort to aid returning veterans); and vice president of the New York State Bar Association.

Death and burial
Bleakley died in Yonkers on October 2, 1969.  He was interred at Gate of Heaven Cemetery in Hawthorne, New York.

References

External links
Biography, William Francis Bleakley at Westchester County Archives
, (p. 4)

 

|-

1883 births
1969 deaths
Burials at Gate of Heaven Cemetery (Hawthorne, New York)
Cornell Law School alumni
New York (state) lawyers
New York (state) Republicans
New York (state) state court judges
New York Supreme Court Justices
Westchester County, New York Executives
20th-century American judges
20th-century American lawyers